The Men's 400 metre medley competition of the 2019 African Games was held on 22 August 2019.

Records
Prior to the competition, the existing world and championship records were as follows.

Results

References

Men's 400 metre medley